Kim Sa-seok (born 13 September 1967) is a South Korean volleyball player. He competed in the men's tournament at the 1988 Summer Olympics.

References

1967 births
Living people
South Korean men's volleyball players
Olympic volleyball players of South Korea
Volleyball players at the 1988 Summer Olympics
Place of birth missing (living people)